James Joseph O'Donnell (born 1950) is a classical scholar and University Librarian at Arizona State University.  He formerly served as University Professor at Georgetown University (2012-2015) and as Provost of Georgetown University from 2002 to 2012. O'Donnell previously served as Vice Provost for Information Systems and Computing at the University of Pennsylvania (1996–2002). He is a former President of the American Philological Association and a Fellow of the Medieval Academy of America. From 2012 to 2018, he chaired the Board of the American Council of Learned Societies.

O'Donnell writes and lectures on topics of the late Roman Empire, Augustine of Hippo, and also on information technology in the modern academic and cultural world. He was an early adopter of the World Wide Web for academic collaboration within the humanities. He has been involved with Bryn Mawr Classical Review since it was founded in 1990. In 1994, he offered the first Internet MOOC when five hundred students around the world participated in his University of Pennsylvania seminar on the life and work of St. Augustine through gopher and email connectivity.

Books
O'Donnell's books include more technical scholarly works on history and philosophy, with a special interest in Augustine of Hippo, but he has also three books that are addressed to a general audience. Avatars of the Word (Harvard University Press:  1998) outlines the history of writing and media from ancient Greek times to the present, while Augustine: A New Biography (HarperCollins 2005) was widely reviewed (e.g., The New Republic, The Economist, The New York Times). An account of the end of Roman grandeur, The Ruin of the Roman Empire (HarperCollins:  2008), was widely praised.  His Pagans was published in 2015. His latest book, a new translation of Julius Caesar's commentaries on the Gallic Wars, came out in 2019.

 Cassiodorus (1979) University of California Press; 
 Scholarly Journals at the Crossroads:  A Subversive Proposal for Electronic Publishing (edited, with Ann Shumelda Okerson) (1995) Association of Research Libraries;  
 Avatars of the Word: From Papyrus to Cyberspace (1998) Harvard University Press;  
 Augustine: A New Biography (2005) Ecco Press; 
 The Ruin of the Roman Empire: A New History (2008) Ecco Press; 
 Pagans (2015) Ecco Press; 
 The War for Gaul: A New Translation (2019) Princeton University Press;

Education
 1972 A. B. Princeton University
 1975 Ph.D. Yale University

Esoterica
O'Donnell's website includes a biographical sketch of Doughbelly Price.  Price was a cowboy turned real estate agent in Taos, New Mexico.  The biography includes a profile from Life in 1949 and feature audio clips of old cowboy songs by Price.

The 2007 edition of the Edge - the third culture Annual Question O'Donnell offered positive words on humanity: "we turn out to be a stubbornly smart, resilient and persistent species, and we do not forget the most important things."

Notes

External links
Personal website

1950 births
Living people
Princeton University alumni
Yale University alumni
Georgetown University faculty